Communauté d'agglomération de la Région Nazairienne et de l'Estuaire (CARENE) is an intercommunal structure, centred on the city of Saint-Nazaire. It is located in the Loire-Atlantique department, in the Pays de la Loire region, western France. It was created in December 2000. Its seat is in Saint-Nazaire. Its area is 320.3 km2. Its population was 124,487 in 2017, of which 69,993 in Saint-Nazaire proper.

Composition
The communauté d'agglomération consists of the following 10 communes:

Besné
La Chapelle-des-Marais
Donges
Montoir-de-Bretagne
Pornichet
Saint-André-des-Eaux
Saint-Joachim
Saint-Malo-de-Guersac
Saint-Nazaire
Trignac

References

Saint-Nazaire
Saint-Nazaire